The San Mateo County Times was a daily newspaper published by the Media News Group.  The paper is distributed throughout San Mateo County, Monday through Saturday.  Before being sold in 1996, it had been published for over 100 years as the San Mateo Times, originally published by Amphlett Publishing.

San Mateo Times

Amphlett also published a weekly "shopping" newspaper, The San Mateo Post, on Wednesday mornings.  The Times provided extensive coverage of San Mateo County news and sports (sometimes using high school or college correspondents).

It had one of the first television columnists in the San Francisco Bay Area, Bob Foster, who covered the birth of KPIX, San Francisco's first television station, in December 1948.  Foster remained on the staff for many years, covering Bay Area television and radio.  He was an occasional guest on KGO Radio talk shows.

In 1968, Amphlett acquired several weekly newspapers in San Bruno, South San Francisco, Pacifica, and Daly City.  All operations for these papers were moved to a central facility in South San Francisco.

In 1996, the Times and the surviving weekly newspapers owned and published by Amphlett were purchased by ANG Newspapers (Alameda Newspaper Group), an Oakland, California-based subsidiary of MediaNews Group, a national chain of newspapers and broadcast stations with corporate offices at 101 W. Colfax Avenue, Denver, Colorado.  The daily newspaper, known since 1979 as The Times, was renamed the San Mateo County Times.

In 2011, Bay Area News Group announced that the San Mateo Times  would publish its last issue on November 1, 2011. From Nov. 2, 2011, subscribers would receive localized versions of the San Jose Mercury News. The plan was later canceled. In 2016, the San Mateo Times was merged into the San Jose Mercury News.

References

External links

Official website

Daily newspapers published in the San Francisco Bay Area
San Mateo County, California
MediaNews Group publications
Publications established in 1901
Publications disestablished in 2016
Defunct newspapers published in California
1901 establishments in California
2016 disestablishments in California